Thomas Callister Hales (born June 4, 1958) is an American mathematician working in the areas of representation theory, discrete geometry, and formal verification. In representation theory he is known for his work on the Langlands program and the proof of the fundamental lemma over the group Sp(4) (many of his ideas were incorporated into the final proof of the fundamental lemma, due to Ngô Bảo Châu).  In discrete geometry, he settled the Kepler conjecture on the density of sphere packings and the honeycomb conjecture. In 2014, he announced the completion of the Flyspeck Project, which formally verified the correctness of his proof of the Kepler conjecture.

Biography
He received his Ph.D. from Princeton University in 1986 with a dissertation titled The Subregular Germ of Orbital Integrals. Hales taught at Harvard University and the University of Chicago, and from 1993 and 2002 he worked at the University of Michigan.

In 1998, Hales submitted his paper on the computer-aided proof of the Kepler conjecture; a centuries-old problem in discrete geometry which states that the most space-efficient way to pack spheres is in a tetrahedron shape. He was aided by graduate student Samuel Ferguson. In 1999, Hales proved the honeycomb conjecture, he also stated that the conjecture may have been present in the minds of mathematicians before Marcus Terentius Varro.

After 2002, Hales became the University of Pittsburgh's Mellon Professor of Mathematics. In 2003, Hales started work on Flyspeck to vindicate his proof of the Kepler conjecture. His proof relied on computer calculation to verify conjectures. The project used two proof assistants; HOL Light and Isabelle. Annals of Mathematics accepted the proof in 2005; but was only 99% sure of the proof. In August 2014, the Flyspeck team's software finally verified the proof to be correct.

In 2017, he initiated the Formal Abstracts project which aims to provide formalised statements of the main results of each mathematical research paper in the language of an interactive theorem prover. The goal of this project is to benefit from the increased precision and interoperability that computer formalisation provides while circumventing the effort that a full-scale formalisation of all published proofs currently entails. In the long term, the project hopes to build a corpus of mathematical facts which would allow for the application of machine learning techniques in interactive and automated theorem proving.

Awards and memberships
Hales won the Chauvenet Prize in 2003 and a Lester R. Ford Award in 2008. In 2012 he became a fellow of the American Mathematical Society. He was invited to give the Tarski Lectures in 2019; his three lectures were titled "A formal proof of the Kepler conjecture", "Formalizing mathematics", and "Integrating with Logic".

Publications

Notes

External links
 

20th-century American mathematicians
21st-century American mathematicians
1958 births
Living people
University of Michigan faculty
Princeton University alumni
Scientists from Pittsburgh
University of Pittsburgh faculty
Fellows of the American Mathematical Society
People from San Antonio
Mathematicians from Texas
Tarski lecturers